El'ad, , is a city in the Central District of Israel. In the 1990s, it was built for a Haredi Jewish population and to a lesser extent, it was also built for a Religious Zionist Jewish population. El'ad is the only locality in Israel officially designated a religious municipality. The name El'ad means "Forever God", but it is also named after a member of the tribe of Ephraim, who lived in this area (1 Chronicles 7:21).

History

During the 18th and 19th centuries, El'ad was the site of the Arab village of Al-Muzayri'a. It belonged to the Nahiyeh (sub-district) of Lod that encompassed the area of the present-day city of Modi'in-Maccabim-Re'ut in the south to the present-day city of El’ad in the north, and from the foothills in the east, through the Lod Valley to the outskirts of Jaffa in the west. This area was home to thousands of inhabitants in about 20 villages, who had at their disposal tens of thousands of hectares of prime agricultural land.

The building of El'ad started in the late 1990s, following a government decision in 1990 to build a series of settlements along the seam line with the West Bank under then-housing minister Ariel Sharon, and provide immediate housing for 50,000 residents. The town was built from scratch as a planned community according to urban planning paradigms not unlike Modi'in and nearby Shoham. While those towns were designed to suit a mixed population of secular and religious Jews, El'ad was originally planned to suit a mixed population of Modern Orthodox/Religious Zionist Jews and ultra-Orthodox Haredi Jews, offering a solution to the acute shortage of affordable housing for Haredi families. The majority of the population are Haredi Jews. Accordingly, El'ad is built in a way that suits their religious lifestyle, with a larger selection of housing options offering larger than average apartments to accommodate religious families, who tend to have more children than the average national population. Another characteristic is easy access and short walking distances to local education institutions to avoid the need for school transportation costs.

The city was built partially over the ruins of the Palestinian Arab village of Al-Muzayri'a, whose population fled in 1948.

By 1998, El'ad had already achieved local council status; in February 2008, El'ad's official status was changed to a city. The city's current mayor is Israel Porush, a member of the United Torah Judaism party.

On 5 May 2022 on Israel's Independence Day, in a park in El'ad four people were killed and four wounded in a 2022 El'ad stabbing by two Palestinians.

Demographics
El'ad is one of the fastest-growing towns in Israel, with an annual population growth of 0.8 percent. The population density per square kilometer is 13.1, median age is 11. The percentage of those eligible for a matriculation certificate among 12th grade students in the year 2019-2020 was 28.3%. The average monthly salary of an employee during the year 2019 was 6,219 NIS (national average: 9,745 NIS).

Economy
The support center of Ramat Gan-based Israeli company Daronet is located in El'ad. Its workers are ultra-Orthodox women. In 2012, Daronet signed a sales agreement worth  with Saudi energy giant Yanar.

Notable people
 Asher Dahan, stabbed and killed Rabbi Elazar Abuhatzeira (1948–2011) for allegedly giving him poor marital advice.
 Avishay Shindler, killed in 2010 at age 24 while driving near Bnei Naim Junction.
 Eyal Yifrah, 19-year old killed in the 2014 kidnapping and murder of Israeli teenagers.

References

Cities in Central District (Israel)
Hebrew-language names
Planned communities
Religious Israeli communities